Senator Joyce may refer to:

Brian A. Joyce (1962–2018), Massachusetts State Senate
Janet J. Joyce (1940–2015), Illinois State Senate
Jeremiah E. Joyce (born 1943), Illinois State Senate
Jerome J. Joyce (born 1939), Illinois State Senate